Erih Koš (Erich Kosch; Serbian Cyrillic: Ерих Кош) (April 15, 1913 – May 25, 2010) was a Jewish Bosnian writer and translator. He was born in Sarajevo, Bosnia and Herzegovina (then a condominium in Austria-Hungary).

Biography
He graduated from the University of Belgrade's Law School and was active as a lawyer since 1935. In 1941, he participated in the resistance fight and held many different political-cultural positions during and after the Second World War in communist Yugoslavia. Koš wrote mainly novels and narrations, which treat topics of the resistance or problems of the Yugoslav society. Beside the telling work he wrote spirit-rich essays and translated Goethe and Chamisso into Serbian.

In 1967, he won prestigious NIN Prize for his novel Mreža (The Net).

In 1978 he was elected as a member of Serbian Academy of Sciences and Arts in the Department of Language and Literature.

Works
 U vatri - narrations 1947
 Tri hronike - narrations 1949
 Zapisi o mladim ljudima - 1950
 Vreme, narrations 1952
 Čudnovata povest o Kitu Velikom takođe zvanom Veliki Mak, novel 1956; translated into English as The Strange Story of the Great Whale Also Known as Big Mac, 1962
 Il tifo, a novel 1958
 Kao vuci, narrations 1958
 Sneg i led, a novel 1961
 Novosadski pokolj, a novel 1961
 Vrapci Van Pea, a novel 1962
 Prvo lice jednine, narrations 1963
 Imena, a novel 1964
 Taj prokleti zanat spisateljski, essays 1965
 Mreža, a novel 1967
 Satire, 1968
 Mešano društvo, narrations 1969
 Zašto da ne 1971
 Dosije Hrabak, a novel 1971
 Cveće i bodlje, narrations 1972
 The best years, narration dt. 1972
 Na autobuskoj stanici, narrations 1974
 U potrazi za Mesijom, 2 Bde., a novel 1978
 Bosanske priče, narrations 1984
 Satira i satiričari, essays 1985
 Šamforova smrt, novel 1986
 Pisac govora, 1989
 Uzgredne zabeleške, Aphorisms 1990
 Miševi, novel 1991

Translations published in around ten countries across Europe and in the USA.

References

External links 
 Serbian Serbian Academy of Sciences and Arts (Serbian Website; photography)

1913 births
2010 deaths
Writers from Sarajevo
Jewish Bosnian writers
Bosnia and Herzegovina writers
Serbian translators
Serbian novelists
Serbian male short story writers
Serbian short story writers
Serbian non-fiction writers
Serbian science fiction writers
Yugoslav science fiction writers
Serbian literary critics
Literary critics of Serbian
Serbian autobiographers
German–Serbian translators
Members of the Serbian Academy of Sciences and Arts
University of Belgrade Faculty of Law alumni
20th-century Serbian novelists
20th-century translators
20th-century short story writers
20th-century male writers
Male non-fiction writers